The 2006 California Attorney General election occurred on November 7, 2006. The primary elections took place on June 6, 2006. Former and future Governor Jerry Brown, the Democratic nominee, easily defeated the Republican nominee, State Senator Chuck Poochigian, for the office previously held by Democrat Bill Lockyer, who was term-limited and ran for Treasurer.

Primary results
Results by county are available here and here.

Democratic

Others

Results

Results by county
Results from the Secretary of State of California:

See also
California state elections, 2006
State of California
California Attorney General
List of attorneys general of California

References

External links
VoteCircle.com Non-partisan resources & vote sharing network for Californians
Information on the elections from California's Secretary of State 
Official Homepage of the California Attorney General
Bar graph of statewide results

2006 California elections
California Attorney General elections
California
2006